OpenTaal ("Open Language") is a Dutch foundation which provides free Dutch language files to be used in open-source software spell checking, hyphenation, thesaurus and grammar checking.

Background 
In 1996 a working group of the Dutch TeX User's Group created a word list for spell checking and hyphenation to be used in TeX software. This list is also used in OpenOffice.org and has been developed since. At the end of 2005 the Dutch Language Union (Nederlandse Taalunie), the formal Dutch language institute, published a new version of the "Woordenlijst Nederlandse Taal" (Dutch Language Word list, also known as "the Green Booklet"). The new spelling rules laid down in it are compulsory in government and education of participating countries since August 2006. To comply with the spelling changes, the existing free language files had to be adjusted. At the same time, the opportunity arose to have them certified by the Dutch Language Union. The OpenTaal project was founded to facilitate the collaboration of open source projects in this area.

Projects

Spell checking 
OpenTaal provides files for spelling check which are being used in software such as OpenOffice.org, Firefox, Thunderbird, Safari, Opera, TinyMCE and more. Some of this software receives custom files from OpenTaal while other software uses the generic spelling checker Hunspell. This is using its own custom file from OpenTaal. Even the Dutch Wiktionary uses this list of correctly spelled words.

Word list 
The Dutch Language Union has approved OpenTaal's word list and labelled it with Keurmerk Spelling. Also OpenTaal has been granted funding by the Dutch Language Union to implement missing functionality in Hunspell.

Thesaurus 
A thesaurus has been set up in which many different relations between words and meaning of words can be browsed and edited.

Grammar checking 
OpenTaal also provides grammar rules which are used in the grammar checker LanguageTool. This is offering grammar checking via its own website but is also used by OpenOffice.org and Thunderbird. This grammar checker also identifies possible false friends.

Partners 

Since 2012, OpenTaal has an official program for partners. These are third parties which have access to special partner products. From these collaborations the following has come forth. One partner has provided Dutch support for Wordfeud and another partner has made an educational poster on diacritical marks in the Dutch language.

References

External links 
 

Foundations based in the Netherlands
Dutch language
Dutch dictionaries
2005 establishments in the Netherlands